Yves Allegro and Horia Tecău were the defending champions, however Tecău chose to not participate.
Yves Allegro partnered up with Daniele Bracciali and they won in the final 6–4, 6–2, against Manuel Jorquera and Francesco Piccari.

Seeds

Draw

Draw

References
 Doubles Draw

Zenith Tennis Cup - Doubles
Aspria Tennis Cup